The Junpai A70 is a subcompact sedan produced by the FAW Group under the Junpai brand.

Overview
The Junpai A70 was launched in the Chinese market in November 2015, with prices ranging from 64,800 yuan to 87,800 yuan. The Junpai A70 shares the same platform as the Besturn B30 subcompact sedan produced by FAW Group, and was classified as the A-class segment of the Chinese car market which is equivalent to the B-segment in foreign markets or subcompact cars.

The Junpai A70 debuted on the 2016 Beijing Auto Show in April 2016, with the market launch in August 2016.

An electric version is available as the A70E.

References

External links
 Junpai A70 Official site
 Junpai A70E Official site

Subcompact cars
Sedans
Cars of China
Cars introduced in 2016
Front-wheel-drive vehicles